Nationality words link to articles with information on the nation's poetry or literature (for instance, Irish or France).

Events

Works published
 Nicholas Breton:
 The Arbor of Amorous Devises, anthology partly by Breton, probably compiled by the printer, Richard Jones; reprints 10 poems from Brittons Bowre of Delights 1591
 Auspicante Jehova
 John Dowland, The First Booke of Songes or Ayres of Fowre Partes verse and music (see also Second Booke 1600, Third and Last Booke 1603)
Michael Drayton, Englands Heroicall Epistles (expanded in 1598; reprinted in The Barrons Wars 1603)
 Joseph Hall, Virgidemiarum, Sixe Bookes
 Henry Lok, Ecclesiastes, Otherwise Called the Preacher
 Gervase Markham, translated from a lost original work by Genevieve Petau de Maulette, Devoreux
 Thomas Middleton, The Wisodome of Solomon Paraphrased
 Thomas Morley, Cazonets; or, Little Short Songs to Foure Voyces, verse and music (see also Canzonets 1593)
 Robert Parry, Sinetes Passion Uppon his Fortunes
 Robert Tofte, Laura: The Toyes of a Traveller; or, The Feast of Fancie, contains a statement, likely untrue, that more than 30 of the poems in the book are not by Tofte
 Nicholas Yonge, Musica Transalpina. Cantus, verse and music (see also Musica Transalpina 1588

Births
Death years link to the corresponding "[year] in poetry" article:
 February 24 – Vincent Voiture (died 1648), French poet and writer
 May 31 – Jean-Louis Guez de Balzac (died 1654), French writer and poet writing verses in both French and Latin
 December 23 – Martin Opitz von Boberfeld (died 1639), German
 Also:
 Johan van Heemskerk (died 1656), Dutch poet
 Christopher Harvey (died 1662), English
 Claude de Malleville (died 1634), French
 Rachel Speght (death year not known), English polemicist and poet
 Wang Wei (died 1647), Chinese prostitute and poet

Deaths

Birth years link to the corresponding "[year] in poetry" article:
 June 6 – William Hunnis (birth year not known), English
 June 9 – Joseph of Anchieta (born 1534), Spanish Jesuit missionary, poet and playwright
 Also:
 Fernando de Herrera (born c. 1534), Spanish
 George Turberville, also spelled "Turbervile", death year uncertain (born c. 1544), English poet and translator

See also

 Poetry
 16th century in poetry
 16th century in literature
 Dutch Renaissance and Golden Age literature
 Elizabethan literature
 English Madrigal School
 French Renaissance literature
 Renaissance literature
 Spanish Renaissance literature
 University Wits

Notes

16th-century poetry
Poetry